Bern Theatre, known in the city as Stadttheater Bern, is an opera house and theatre in Bern, Switzerland. The theatre opened in 1903 and was modernised between 2015–2016 with significant structural changes made to the backstage and auditorium.

The theatre took on a new trading name from the 2011/2012 season through to the 2020/2021 as Konzert Theatre Bern representing the four different sections of the theatre; the Bern Symphony Orchestra (BSO), Musiktheater (Opera), Schauspiel (Theatre) and Tanz (Dance).

Starting in the season of 2021 / 2022 the theatre will be known as Bühnen Bern.

Famous past performers include Robin Adams, Agnes Baltsa, Inge Borkh, Renato Bruson, Grace Bumbry, José Carreras, Plácido Domingo, Salvatore Fisichella, Käthe Gold, Norma Sharp, Alexander Moissi, Jessye Norman, Liselotte Pulver, Will Quadflieg, Nello Santi, Christine Schäfer, Maria Schell, and Rolf Schimpf.

Further reading

References

External links
Website as of season 2021/2022
Website until season 2020/2021

Theatres in Bern
Opera houses in Switzerland
Buildings and structures in Bern
Tourist attractions in Bern